Celidosphenella diespasmena is a species of tephritid or fruit flies in the genus Celidosphenella of the family Tephritidae.

Distribution
Chile, Argentina.

References

Tephritinae
Insects described in 1868
Diptera of South America